Qingzhou or Qing Prefecture was a zhou (prefecture) in imperial China centering on modern Qingyang in Gansu, China. It existed (intermittently) from 596 to 1125.

Geography
The administrative region of Qingzhou in the Tang dynasty is in Qingyang in eastern Gansu near the border with Shaanxi. It probably includes parts of modern: 
Qingyang
Heshui County
Huachi County
Qingcheng County
Huan County

References
 

Prefectures of the Sui dynasty
Prefectures of the Tang dynasty
Prefectures of the Song dynasty
Prefectures of the Jin dynasty (1115–1234)
Prefectures of Later Liang (Five Dynasties)
Prefectures of Later Han (Five Dynasties)
Prefectures of Later Jin (Five Dynasties)
Prefectures of Later Tang
Prefectures of Later Zhou
Prefectures of Qi (Five Dynasties)
Former prefectures in Gansu
Populated places established in the 6th century
596 establishments
6th-century establishments in China
1125 disestablishments in Asia
12th-century disestablishments in China